Sahray-ye Bagh Rural District is a rural district (dehestan) in Sahray-ye Bagh District, Larestan County, Fars Province, Iran. At the 2006 census, its population was 6,576, in 1,418 families.  The rural district has 17 villages.

References 

Rural Districts of Fars Province
Larestan County